Charlie Chan's Greatest Case (1933) is an American pre-Code murder mystery film starring Warner Oland as the Oriental detective Charlie Chan. It was based on the Earl Derr Biggers novel The House Without a Key (1925).

Oland made a series of Charlie Chan films; along with three others, this one is considered to be a lost film.

Reception
The New York Times reviewer wrote, "As far as the mystery of these particular murders is concerned it is not difficult for the audience to decide on the identity of the slayer, but the manner in which Chan makes his deductions is always interesting."

Cast
Warner Oland as Charlie Chan
Heather Angel as Carlotta Eagan
Roger Imhof as The Beachcomber
John Warburton as John Quincy Winterslip
Walter Byron as Henry Jennison
Ivan F. Simpson as Brade
Virginia Cherrill as Barbara Winterslip
Francis Ford as Captain Hallett
Robert Warwick as Dan Winterslip
Frank McGlynn Sr. as Amos Winterslip
Clara Blandick as Minerva Winterslip
Claude King as Capt. Arthur Cope
William Stack as James Eagan
Gloria Roy as Arlene Compton
Cornelius Keefe as Steve Letherbee
Frances Chan as Youngest Chan Daughter

References

External links

1933 films
Fox Film films
American black-and-white films
Films set in Hawaii
Films directed by Hamilton MacFadden
Lost American films
1933 mystery films
Films based on American novels
Films based on mystery novels
American mystery films
1933 lost films
1930s American films